The Harare International Festival of the Arts (HIFA) is one of Africa's largest international arts festivals. Established in 1999 by Manuel Bagorro the festival takes place each year in late April or early May in Harare, the capital of Zimbabwe. The week-long festival encompasses five principal disciplines: theatre, music, dance, fine art, and poetry.

Operating in a difficult environment 
Organizing and facilitating a festival the size of HIFA in the difficult sociopolitical and economic conditions that characterize Zimbabwe today is no easy task. 2008 was a particularly difficult year for the Festival, with controversial elections and hyperinflation, which ultimately led to the collapse of the Zimbabwean Dollar, providing an unsettling backdrop.

Funding 
As a private endeavour, HIFA depends on funding from private sources, including local businesses and multinational corporations. Further supplementary funding comes from donors, and embassy missions represented in Harare. Funding from embassies and missions is largely used to facilitate artists from their respective countries. 
Other revenue sources include fees collected from ticket sales from the different shows run during HIFA week.

References

External links

BBC Radio Interview with Manuel Bagorro
BBC Blog on the 2008 Festival
2008 Guardian Article
KadmusArts Entry

Arts festivals in Zimbabwe
Zimbabwean art
Harare
Festivals in Zimbabwe
Tourist attractions in Harare
1999 establishments in Zimbabwe
Festivals established in 1999
Annual events in Zimbabwe
Spring (season) events in Zimbabwe
Art festivals in Africa